IV: Blazing Hot, the fourth and final studio album by hip-hop duo Nice & Smooth. It was released on October 28, 1997, by Scotti Brothers Records and was produced by Greg Nice, Smooth B., DJ Premier, Easy Mo Bee, and Kid Capri. It received some positive reviews, but was a commercial failure.  It reached #75 on the Top R&B/Hip-Hop Albums chart, while one single, "Blazing Hot", made it to the charts, #21 on the Hot Rap Singles.

Track listing

Samples
"Let It Go"
"Piano in the Dark" by Brenda Russell
"Blazing Hot"
"Get Out of My Life, Woman" by The Mad Lads
"Sad Song" by Amanda Ambrose
"Lockdown"
"Impeach the President" by The Honeydrippers
"Same Old Brand New Style (I Can't Wait)"
"I Can't Wait" by Nu Shooz

References

Nice & Smooth albums
1997 albums
Albums produced by DJ Premier
Albums produced by Easy Mo Bee